Mohamed Bensaïd Stadium, is a multi-use stadium in Mostaganem, Algeria, it is a part of Complexe Commandant Ferradji. It is currently used mostly for football matches and is the home ground of ES Mostaganem and WA Mostaganem. The stadium holds 18,000 spectators.

References

External links
Stadium Information
dzfoot club profile

Sports venues in Algeria
Buildings and structures in Mostaganem Province